The California Federation of Teachers is a teachers' union in California. It represents more than 120,000 educational employees. It is affiliated with American Federation of Teachers and the AFL–CIO.

The California Federation of Teachers is one of two main teachers' unions in California. The other is the California Teachers Association.

The California Federation of Teachers is a major spender in California politics.

References

Teacher associations based in the United States
Education trade unions
Trade unions in the United States
Educational organizations based in California